Afroudakis is a Greek surname. The female form of the surname is Afroudaki. Notable people with the surname include:

Christos Afroudakis (born 1984), Greek water polo player
Georgios Afroudakis (born 1976), Greek water polo player

Greek-language surnames